The Brenz is a river in Baden-Württemberg and Bavaria, Germany. It is a left tributary of the Danube. Its source is at a spring in the town of Königsbronn and it flows for 52 kilometers before meeting the Danube at Lauingen, a few kilometers west of Dillingen. It flows through the towns of Königsbronn, Heidenheim an der Brenz, Giengen and Lauingen.

See also
List of rivers of Baden-Württemberg
List of rivers of Bavaria

References

Rivers of Baden-Württemberg
Rivers of Bavaria
Rivers of Germany